KronoScope is a peer-reviewed academic journal dedicated to the interdisciplinary study of time, both in the humanities and in the sciences. It is published biannually under the imprint of Brill Publishers on behalf of the International Society for the Study of Time. It is indexed in Sociological Abstracts.

See also 
 Julius Thomas Fraser
 Temporality
 Time

References 

Time
Sociology journals
Brill Publishers academic journals